The Battle of Kupiansk was the third battle of the Ukrainian Kharkiv counteroffensive that began on September 8, 2022 and ended on September 16, 2022. A Financial Times article on 28 September depicted the battle and the Ukrainian advance preceding it as "The 90km journey that changed the course of the war in Ukraine."

Background 

Kupiansk was occupied by Russian forces from 27 February 2022 to 10 September 2022. Although the Ukrainian army had destroyed a railway bridge to slow the Russian advance three days earlier, Kupiansk Mayor Hennadiy Matsehora, member of the Opposition Platform — For Life party, surrendered the city to the Russian Army in exchange for a cessation of hostilities, as the Russians threatened to take the city by force. As a result, the Ukrainian government indicted Matsehora for treason the next day. On 28 February 2022, Matsehora was arrested by Ukrainian authorities. Later Kupiansk became the de facto seat of the Russian-backed Kharkiv military-civilian administration.

Battle 
Prior to the battle, the Ukrainian general staff claimed an attack on a Russian military base in Kupiansk on September 5 killed 100 Russian soldiers.

On 8 September 2022, following a large-scale Ukrainian counteroffensive capturing over 20 settlements in just days, Russian occupation authorities in the city claimed that Russian forces began to defend Kupiansk. Ukrainian soldiers of the Kraken Regiment entered the outskirts of Kupiansk on September 9, recapturing the city council building by the next morning. Fighting damaged much of the town's center. Later that day, Ukrainian officials announced that Kupiansk had been liberated.

Maxim Gubin, the pro-Russian mayoral replacement for Matsehora, had fled to Russia following Ukraine retaking Kupiansk.

Russian forces evacuated to the eastern side of the Oskil River, in the town of Kupiansk-Vuzlovyi, and blew the connecting bridge to the town while retreating. During the battle for the adjacent city, Russian forces bombed the local meat factory of Kupiansk, killing around a thousand pigs. Ukrainian forces recaptured the settlement on September 16. In the immediate aftermath of the battle, the bodies of Russian soldiers were strewn around both Kupiansk and Kupiansk-Vuzlovyi.

Aftermath 

Following the Ukrainian liberation of the towns, Russian forces have shelled Kupiansk since. The first strikes against the town were on September 13, which killed two civilians. The next day, one person was wounded from airstrikes. On September 18, five people were injured from shelling in Kupiansk. Two days later, two civilians were killed and five injured after Russian shelling on the city. On September 22, a woman and two children were injured by shelling. On September 27, five civilians were injured after a Russian strike on a church in Kupiansk.

On October 3, Russian shelling of a hospital in Kupiansk killed a doctor and injured a nurse. One woman was injured on October 5 by an airstrike.

On September 26, Russian forces shelled a convoy of civilians escaping the villages of Kurylivka and Pishchane, near Kupiansk, killing 26 civilians. Signs of torture were discovered in Russian administration centers throughout the city.

See also

 2022 Ukrainian Kharkiv counteroffensive
 Battle of Balakliia
 Battle of Shevchenkove
 Russian occupation of Kharkiv Oblast
 Battle of Kharkiv (2022)

References

September 2022 events in Ukraine
History of Kharkiv Oblast
Kupiansk
Eastern Ukraine offensive